Something for Everybody is a 1961 album by Elvis Presley

Something for Everybody may also refer to:

 Something for Everybody (Baz Luhrmann album), 1998
 Something for Everybody (Devo album), 2010

See also
 Something for Everyone, a 1970 film starring Angela Lansbury